Maa Bahen Aur Biwi is a 1974 Bollywood drama film directed by Harbans Kumar.

Cast
Kabir Bedi
Prema Narayan
Raj Kishore
David Abraham
Anjana
Jankidas
Tabassum
Tun Tun

External links
 

1974 films
1970s Hindi-language films
1974 drama films